Ari station is a BTS Skytrain station, on the Sukhumvit Line in Phaya Thai District, Bangkok, Thailand. The station is on Phahonyothin Road at Soi Ari junction (Soi Phahon Yothin 7), an area with many office towers, apartments, food stalls, and restaurants. The headquarters of the Ministry of Finance, the Ministry of Natural Resources and Environment, and the Public Relations Department are also in the neighbourhood of Soi Ari near Rama VI Road, a short distance to the west of the station.

See also
 Bangkok Skytrain

References

BTS Skytrain stations